The Social Democracy of Poland (SDPL) is a social-democratic political party in Poland.

Foundation
The party was founded in April 2004 as a splinter group from the post-communist Democratic Left Alliance (SLD). The SDPL should not be confused with a former party Social Democracy of the Republic of Poland (SdRP) which existed between 1990–99 and was a direct predecessor of the SLD.

First elections
SDPL contested its first elections in June 2004, these being for Polish representation to the European parliament. The party gained 5.3%, which saw three members elected to parliament. In May 2005 the party reached an agreement with Labour Union (UP) and Greens 2004 to jointly contest the forthcoming Polish parliamentary elections, under the SDPL banner. SDPL managed to gain 3.9% of the vote, but fell short of the 5% threshold required to win parliamentary representation. SDPL put forward its party leader Marek Borowski, as candidate for the Polish presidential elections held in the following month of October. Borowski came fourth in the first round, winning 10.3% of the vote.

Coalition within LiD
On 3 September 2006, SDPL joined the newly formed Left and Democrats (LiD) coalition, made up of the centre-left parties SDPL, SLD, UP and the centrist Democratic Party – demokraci.pl. This alliance was created with a view to jointly contest the upcoming local government elections. The LiD alliance was maintained for the Polish parliamentary elections of October 2007, and LiD achieved 13.2% of the vote. This translated into 53 lower house seats, 10 of which were won by SDPL.

After LiD dissolved, 8 out of 10 SDPL MPs formed a new parliamentary caucus called Social Democracy of Poland – New Left (Socjaldemoracja Polska – Nowa Lewica, SDPL-NL).

On 3 February 2013, SDPL leader Wojciech Filemonowicz and Palikot's Movement leader Janusz Palikot stated an ambition to form an electoral alliance between the two parties to contest the European elections in 2014. The alliance was named Europa Plus. The SDPL withdrew from the alliance, along with the Union of the Left, on 7 February 2014.

Election results

Sejm

Senate

Presidential

European Parliament

Elected representatives

Members of the Sejm
Prior to the October, 2011, Polish parliamentary election, where the party's representation was wiped out, SDPL had three members of the Sejm:

 Marek Borowski (19 – Warsaw I)
 Grażyna Ciemniak (4 – Bydgoszcz)
 Izabella Sierakowska (6 – Lublin)

Marek Borowski, was elected to the Polish Senate in the 2011 elections as an independent candidate. He retained his membership of SDPL.

References

External links

2004 establishments in Poland
Parties related to the Party of European Socialists
Political parties established in 2004
Political parties in Poland
Social democratic parties in Poland